The Teatro del Fondo is a theatre in Naples, now known as the Teatro Mercadante. It is located on Piazza del Municipio #1, with the front facing the west side of Castel Nuovo and near the Molo (Dock) Siglio. Together with the Teatro San Carlo, it was originally one of the two royal opera houses of the 18th and 19th-century city.

It opened in 1779 as the 'Teatro del Real Fondo di Separazione', with comic operas sung mainly in Tuscan. The Mozart operas Don Giovanni, The Marriage of Figaro and Così fan tutte were performed there (1812-1815) and also a number of French operas under the patronage and influence of Joseph Bonaparte, King of Naples (1806-1808). The theatre was later used by Gioachino Rossini, who became the music director of the royal theatres, Giovanni Pacini and Gaetano Donizetti and many other leading composers.

After a period of relative inactivity, in 1871 it was renamed the Real Teatro Mercadante, after Saverio Mercadante, whereupon opera productions once again flourished at the theatre.

It is now part of the Teatro Stabile Napoli.

References
Robinson, Michael F and Di Benedetto, Renato (1992), 'Naples' in The New Grove Dictionary of Opera, ed. Stanley Sadie (London) 
Warrack, John and West, Ewan (1992), The Oxford Dictionary of Opera, 782 pages,

External links
Teatro Stabile Napoli history of the theatre

Opera houses in Naples
1779 establishments in Italy
Theatres in Naples
Theatres completed in 1779
Music venues completed in 1779
18th-century architecture in Italy